The Old-Reformed Congregations in the Netherlands (Dutch: Oud Gereformeerde Gemeenten in Nederland) is a pietistic Reformed denomination in the Netherlands.

Characteristics 
The characteristics of the denomination is the loose structure compared to other churches, and less dogmatic rigidity. In the recent years the denomination has worked closely with the Free Presbyterian Church of Scotland.

Statistics 
The federation has 62 congregations and three departments in the Netherlands and one congregation located in Salford, Canada. Membership is approximately 18,000 baptized members. The largest congregations are in Urk, Barneveld, Geldermalsen, Kinderdijk, Krimpen aan den IJssel, Rijssen, Stavenisse. According to the Los Angeles Times, the federation is growing by 50 members annually.

Full list of all churches of the Old-Reformed Congregations in the Netherlands:

History 
The federation was created in 1948 by the union of the Old Reformed Churches (Boone municipalities) and the Federation of Old Reformed Congregations. The Old Reformed Church was founded in 1907 with Pastor Boone as leader. The Federation of Old Reformed Churches was a small denomination founded in 1912. In 1952 a few Christian Reformed Churches also joined the. It has a theological seminary. In missions the Old-Reformed Church collaborates with the Free Presbyterian Church of Scotland.

Growth 
The church experienced growth during the 1950 and the 1960s, mainly because the free congregations joined the Old-Reformed Congregations. The number of the 48 congregations that formed the federation increased to over 60. A few Christian Reformed Churches in the Netherlands parishes joined in Leersum, Thorn and Dortrecht.

Doctrine 
The denomination adheres to the Three Forms of Unity of the Reformed faith: the Belgic Confession, the Canons of Dort, and the Heidelberg Catechism.

Social issues 
The church is against the use of television and movies. Homosexuality, abortion, euthanasia and contraception are regarded as sinful. The children of the members must go to reformed schools. The women must wear long skirts and headcoverings in worship services.

Separations 
In 2007 the Old-Reformed Congregations (unconnected) was formed.

References 

Christian organizations established in 1948
Reformed denominations in the Netherlands
1948 establishments in the Netherlands